Quark–gluon plasma (or QGP and quark soup) is an interacting localized assembly of quarks and gluons at thermal (local kinetic) and (close to) chemical (abundance) equilibrium. The word plasma signals that free color charges are allowed. In a 1987 summary, Léon van Hove pointed out the equivalence of the three terms: quark gluon plasma, quark matter and a new state of matter. Since the temperature is above the Hagedorn temperature—and thus above the scale of light u,d-quark mass—the pressure exhibits the relativistic Stefan-Boltzmann format governed by temperature to the fourth power and many practically massless quark and gluon constituents. It can be said that QGP emerges to be the new phase of strongly interacting matter which manifests its physical properties in terms of nearly free dynamics of practically massless gluons and quarks. Both quarks and gluons must be present in conditions near chemical (yield) equilibrium with their colour charge open for a new state of matter to be referred to as QGP.

In the Big Bang theory, quark–gluon plasma filled the entire Universe before matter as we know it was created. Theories predicting the existence of quark–gluon plasma were developed in the late 1970s and early 1980s. Discussions around heavy ion experimentation followed suit and the first experiment proposals were put forward at CERN and BNL in the following years. Quark–gluon plasma was detected for the first time in the laboratory at CERN in the year 2000.

General introduction 

Quark–gluon plasma is a state of matter in which the elementary particles that make up the hadrons of baryonic matter are freed of their strong attraction for one another under extremely high energy densities. These particles are the quarks and gluons that compose baryonic matter. In normal matter quarks are confined; in the QGP quarks are deconfined. In classical quantum chromodynamics (QCD), quarks are the fermionic components of hadrons (mesons and baryons) while the gluons are considered the bosonic components of such particles. The gluons are the force carriers, or bosons, of the QCD color force, while the quarks by themselves are their fermionic matter counterparts.

Quark–gluon plasma is studied to recreate and understand the high energy density conditions prevailing in the Universe when matter formed from elementary degrees of freedom (quarks, gluons) at about 20 μs after the Big Bang. Experimental groups are probing over a 'large' distance the (de)confining quantum vacuum structure, the present day relativistic æther, which determines prevailing form of matter and laws of nature. The experiments give insight to the origin of matter and mass: the matter and antimatter is created when the quark–gluon plasma 'hadronizes' and the mass of matter originates in the confining vacuum structure.

How the quark–gluon plasma fits into the general scheme of physics 

QCD is one part of the modern theory of particle physics called the Standard Model. Other parts of this theory deal with electroweak interactions and neutrinos. The theory of electrodynamics has been tested and found correct to a few parts in a billion. The theory of weak interactions has been tested and found correct to a few parts in a thousand. Perturbative forms of QCD have been tested to a few percent. Perturbative models assume relatively small changes from the ground state, i.e. relatively low temperatures and densities, which simplifies calculations at the cost of generality. In contrast, non-perturbative forms of QCD have barely been tested. The study of the QGP, which has both a high temperature and density, is part of this effort to consolidate the grand theory of particle physics.

The study of the QGP is also a testing ground for finite temperature field theory, a branch of theoretical physics which seeks to understand particle physics under conditions of high temperature. Such studies are important to understand the early evolution of our universe: the first hundred microseconds or so. It is crucial to the physics goals of a new generation of observations of the universe (WMAP and its successors). It is also of relevance to Grand Unification Theories which seek to unify the three fundamental forces of nature (excluding gravity).

Reasons for studying the formation of quark–gluon plasma 
The generally accepted model of the formation of the Universe states that it happened as the result of the Big Bang. In this model, in the time interval of 10−10–10−6 s after the Big Bang, matter existed in the form of a quark–gluon plasma. It is possible to reproduce the density and temperature of matter existing of that time in laboratory conditions to study the characteristics of the very early Universe. So far, the only possibility is the collision of two heavy atomic nuclei accelerated to energies of more than a hundred GeV. Using the result of a head-on collision in the volume approximately equal to the volume of the atomic nucleus, it is possible to model the density and temperature that existed in the first instants of the life of the Universe.

Relation to normal plasma 

A plasma is matter in which charges are screened due to the presence of other mobile charges.  For example: Coulomb's Law is suppressed by the screening to yield a distance-dependent charge, i.e., the charge Q is reduced exponentially with the distance divided by a screening length α. In a QGP, the color charge of the quarks and gluons is screened. The QGP has other analogies with a normal plasma. There are also dissimilarities because the color charge is non-abelian, whereas the electric charge is abelian. Outside a finite volume of QGP the color-electric field is not screened, so that a volume of QGP must still be color-neutral. It will therefore, like a nucleus, have integer electric charge.

Because of the extremely high energies involved, quark-antiquark pairs are produced by pair production and thus QGP is a roughly equal mixture of quarks and antiquarks of various flavors, with only a slight excess of quarks. This property is not a general feature of conventional plasmas, which may be too cool for pair production (see however pair instability supernova).

Theory 
One consequence of this difference is that the color charge is too large for perturbative computations which are the mainstay of QED. As a result, the main theoretical tools to explore the theory of the QGP is lattice gauge theory. The transition temperature (approximately ) was first predicted by lattice gauge theory. Since then lattice gauge theory has been used to predict many other properties of this kind of matter. The AdS/CFT correspondence conjecture may provide insights in QGP, moreover the ultimate goal of the fluid/gravity correspondence is to understand QGP. The QGP is believed to be a phase of QCD which is completely locally thermalized and thus suitable for an effective fluid dynamic description.

Production 

Production of QGP in the laboratory is achieved by colliding heavy atomic nuclei (called heavy ions as in an accelerator atoms are ionized) at relativistic energy in which matter is heated well above the Hagedorn temperature TH = 150 MeV per particle, which amounts to a temperature exceeding 1.66×1012 K. This can be accomplished by colliding two large nuclei at high energy (note that  is not the energy of the colliding beam). Lead and gold nuclei have been used for such collisions at CERN SPS and BNL RHIC, respectively. The nuclei are accelerated to ultrarelativistic speeds (contracting their length) and directed towards each other, creating a "fireball", in the rare event of a collision. Hydrodynamic simulation predicts this fireball will expand under its own pressure, and cool while expanding. By carefully studying the spherical and elliptic flow, experimentalists put the theory to test.

Diagnostic tools 
There is overwhelming evidence for production of quark–gluon plasma in relativistic heavy ion collisions.

The important classes of experimental observations are
 Strangeness production
 Elliptic flow
 Jet quenching
 J/ψ melting
 Hanbury Brown and Twiss effect and Bose–Einstein correlations
 Single particle spectra (thermal photons and thermal dileptons)

Expected properties

Thermodynamics 
This "crossover" may actually not be only a qualitative feature, but instead one may have to do with a true (second order) phase transition, e.g. of the universality class of the three-dimensional Ising model. For relativistic matter, pressure and temperature are not independent variables, so the equation of state is a relation between the energy density and the pressure. This has been found through lattice computations, and compared to both perturbation theory and string theory. This is still a matter of active research. Response functions such as the specific heat and various quark number susceptibilities are currently being computed.

Flow 
The discovery of the perfect liquid was a turning point in physics. Experiments at RHIC have revealed a wealth of information about this remarkable substance, which we now know to be a QGP. Nuclear matter at "room temperature" is known to behave like a superfluid. When heated the nuclear fluid evaporates and turns into a dilute gas of nucleons and, upon further heating, a gas of baryons and mesons (hadrons). At the critical temperature, TH, the hadrons melt and the gas turns back into a liquid.  RHIC experiments have shown that this is the most perfect liquid ever observed in any laboratory experiment at any scale. The new phase of matter, consisting of dissolved hadrons, exhibits less resistance to flow than any other known substance. The experiments at RHIC have, already in 2005, shown that the Universe at its beginning was uniformly filled with this type of material—a super-liquid—which once the Universe cooled below TH evaporated into a gas of hadrons. Detailed measurements show that this liquid is a quark–gluon plasma where quarks, antiquarks and gluons flow independently.

In short, a quark–gluon plasma flows like a splat of liquid, and because it is not "transparent" with respect to quarks, it can attenuate jets emitted by collisions. Furthermore, once formed, a ball of quark–gluon plasma, like any hot object, transfers heat internally by radiation. However, unlike in everyday objects, there is enough energy available so that gluons (particles mediating the strong force) collide and produce an excess of the heavy (i.e., high-energy) strange quarks. Whereas, if the QGP did not exist and there was a pure collision, the same energy would be converted into a non-equilibrium mixture containing even heavier quarks such as charm quarks or bottom quarks.

The equation of state is an important input into the flow equations. The speed of sound (speed of QGP-density oscillations) is currently under investigation in lattice computations. The mean free path of quarks and gluons has been computed using perturbation theory as well as string theory. Lattice computations have been slower here, although the first computations of transport coefficients have been concluded. These indicate that the mean free time of quarks and gluons in the QGP may be comparable to the average interparticle spacing: hence the QGP is a liquid as far as its flow properties go. This is very much an active field of research, and these conclusions may evolve rapidly. The incorporation of dissipative phenomena into hydrodynamics is another active research area.

Jet quenching effect 
Detailed predictions were made in the late 1970s for the production of jets at the CERN Super Proton–Antiproton Synchrotron. UA2 observed the first evidence for jet production in hadron collisions in 1981, which  shortly after was confirmed by UA1.

The subject was later revived at RHIC. One of the most striking physical effects obtained at RHIC energies is the effect of quenching jets. At the first stage of interaction of colliding relativistic nuclei, partons of the colliding nuclei give rise to the secondary partons with a large transverse impulse ≥ 3–6 GeV/s. Passing through a highly heated compressed plasma, partons lose energy. The magnitude of the energy loss by the parton depends on the properties of the quark–gluon plasma (temperature, density). In addition, it is also necessary to take into account the fact that colored quarks and gluons are the elementary objects of the plasma, which differs from the energy loss by a parton in a medium consisting of colorless hadrons. This conclusion is confirmed by comparing the relative yield of hadrons with a large transverse impulse in nucleon-nucleon and nucleus-nucleus collisions at the same collision energy. The energy loss by partons with a large transverse impulse in nucleon-nucleon collisions is much smaller than in nucleus-nucleus collisions, which leads to a decrease in the yield of high-energy hadrons in nucleus-nucleus collisions. This result suggests that nuclear collisions cannot be regarded as a simple superposition of nucleon-nucleon collisions. For a short time, ~1 μs, and in the final volume, quarks and gluons form some ideal liquid. The collective properties of this fluid are manifested during its movement as a whole. Therefore, when moving partons in this medium, it is necessary to take into account some collective properties of this quark–gluon liquid. Energy losses depend on the properties of the quark–gluon medium, on the parton density in the resulting fireball, and on the dynamics of its expansion. Losses of energy by light and heavy quarks during the passage of a fireball turn out to be approximately the same.

In November 2010 CERN announced the first direct observation of jet quenching, based on experiments with heavy-ion collisions.

Direct photons and dileptons 
Direct photons and dileptons are arguably most penetrating tools to study relativistic heavy ion collisions. They are produced, by various mechanisms spanning the space-time evolution of the strongly interacting fireball. They provide in principle a snapshot on the initial stage as well. They are hard to decipher and interpret as most of the signal is originating from hadron decays long after the QGP fireball has disintegrated.

Glasma hypothesis 
Since 2008, there is a discussion about a hypothetical precursor state of the quark–gluon plasma, the so-called "Glasma", where the dressed particles are condensed into some kind of glassy (or amorphous) state, below the genuine transition between the confined state and the plasma liquid. This would be analogous to the formation of metallic glasses, or amorphous alloys of them, below the genuine onset of the liquid metallic state.

Although the experimental high temperatures and densities predicted as producing a quark–gluon plasma have been realized in the laboratory, the resulting matter does not behave as a quasi-ideal state of free quarks and gluons, but, rather, as an almost perfect dense fluid. Actually, the fact that the quark–gluon plasma will not yet be "free" at temperatures realized at present accelerators was predicted in 1984 as a consequence of the remnant effects of confinement.

In-laboratory formation of deconfined matter 
A quark–gluon plasma (QGP) or quark soup is a state of matter in quantum chromodynamics (QCD) which exists at extremely high temperature and/or density. This state is thought to consist of asymptotically free strong-interacting quarks and gluons, which are ordinarily confined by color confinement inside atomic nuclei or other hadrons. This is in analogy with the conventional plasma where nuclei and electrons, confined inside atoms by electrostatic forces at ambient conditions, can move freely. Experiments to create artificial quark matter started at CERN in 1986/87, resulting in first claims that were published in 1991. It took several years before the idea became accepted in the community of particle and nuclear physicists. Formation of a new state of matter in Pb–Pb collisions was officially announced at CERN in view of the convincing experimental results presented by the CERN SPS WA97 experiment in 1999, and later elaborated by Brookhaven National Laboratory's Relativistic Heavy Ion Collider. Quark matter can only be produced in minute quantities and is unstable and impossible to contain, and will radioactively decay within a fraction of a second into stable particles through hadronization; the produced hadrons or their decay products and gamma rays can then be detected. In the quark matter phase diagram, QGP is placed in the high-temperature, high-density regime, whereas ordinary matter is a cold and rarefied mixture of nuclei and vacuum, and the hypothetical quark stars would consist of relatively cold, but dense quark matter. It is believed that up to a few microseconds (10−12 to 10−6 seconds) after the Big Bang, known as the quark epoch, the Universe was in a quark–gluon plasma state.

The strength of the color force means that unlike the gas-like plasma, quark–gluon plasma behaves as a near-ideal Fermi liquid, although research on flow characteristics is ongoing. Liquid or even near-perfect liquid flow with almost no frictional resistance or viscosity was claimed by research teams at RHIC and LHC's Compact Muon Solenoid detector. QGP differs from a "free" collision event by several features; for example, its particle content is indicative of a temporary chemical equilibrium producing an excess of middle-energy strange quarks vs. a nonequilibrium distribution mixing light and heavy quarks ("strangeness production"), and it does not allow particle jets to pass through ("jet quenching").

Experiments at CERN's Super Proton Synchrotron (SPS) begun experiments to create QGP in the 1980s and 1990s: the results led CERN to announce evidence for a "new state of matter" in 2000. Scientists at Brookhaven National Laboratory's Relativistic Heavy Ion Collider announced they had created quark–gluon plasma by colliding gold ions at nearly the speed of light, reaching temperatures of 4 trillion degrees Celsius. Current experiments (2017) at the Brookhaven National Laboratory's Relativistic Heavy Ion Collider (RHIC) on Long Island (New York, USA) and at CERN's recent Large Hadron Collider near Geneva (Switzerland) are continuing this effort, by colliding relativistically accelerated gold and other ion species (at RHIC) or lead (at LHC) with each other or with protons. Three experiments running on CERN's Large Hadron Collider (LHC), on the spectrometers ALICE, ATLAS and CMS, have continued studying the properties of QGP. CERN temporarily ceased colliding protons, and began colliding lead ions for the ALICE experiment in 2011, in order to create a QGP. A new record breaking temperature was set by ALICE: A Large Ion Collider Experiment at CERN in August 2012 in the ranges of 5.5 trillion kelvin as claimed in their Nature PR.

The formation of a quark–gluon plasma occurs as a result of a strong interaction between the partons (quarks, gluons) that make up the nucleons of the colliding heavy nuclei called heavy ions. Therefore, experiments are referred to as relativistic heavy ion collision experiments. Theoretical and experimental works show that the formation of a quark–gluon plasma occurs at the temperature of T ≈ 150–160 MeV, the Hagedorn temperature, and an energy density of ≈ 0.4–1 GeV / fm3. While at first a phase transition was expected, present day theoretical interpretations propose a phase transformation similar to the process of ionisation of normal matter into ionic and electron plasma.

Quark–gluon plasma and the onset of deconfinement 
The central issue of the formation of a quark–gluon plasma is the research for the onset of deconfinement. From the beginning of the research on formation of QGP, the issue was whether energy density can be achieved in nucleus-nucleus collisions. This depends on how much energy each nucleon loses. An influential reaction picture was the scaling solution presented by Bjorken. This model applies to ultra-high energy collisions. In experiments carried out at CERN SPS and BNL RHIC more complex situation arose, usually divided into three stages:
 Primary parton collisions and baryon stopping at the time of complete overlapping of the colliding nuclei.
 Redistribution of particle energy and new particles born in the QGP fireball.
 The fireball of QGP matter equilibrates and expands before hadronizing.

More and more experimental evidence points to the strength of QGP formation mechanisms—operating even in LHC-energy scale proton-proton collisions.

Further reading

Books

Review articles with a historical perspective of the field

See also 

 Color confinement
 Color-glass condensate
 Hadrons (that is mesons and baryons)
 Hadronization
 Hagedorn temperature
 List of plasma (physics) articles
 Neutron stars
 Plasma physics
 QCD matter
 Quantum electrodynamics
 Quantum chromodynamics
 Quantum hydrodynamics
 Relativistic plasma
 Relativistic nuclear collision
 Strangeness production
 Strange matter
 List of unsolved problems in physics

References

External links 

 The Relativistic Heavy Ion Collider at Brookhaven National Laboratory
 The Alice Experiment  at CERN
 The Indian Lattice Gauge Theory Initiative
 Quark matter reviews: 2004 theory, 2004 experiment
 Quark–Gluon Plasma reviews: 2011 theory
 Lattice reviews: 2003, 2005
 BBC article mentioning Brookhaven results (2005)
 Physics News Update article on the quark–gluon liquid, with links to preprints
 Read for free : "Hadrons and Quark–Gluon Plasma" by Jean Letessier and Johann Rafelski   Cambridge University Press (2002) , Cambridge, UK;

Quark matter
Plasma physics
Phases of matter
Exotic matter
Gluons